Coupé-décalé is a type of popular dance music originating in Côte d'Ivoire/ Ivory Coast. Drawing heavily from zouglou with African influences, coupé-décalé is a very percussive style, featuring African samples, deep bass, and repetitive minimalist arrangements.

History

While coupé-décalé is known as Côte d'Ivoire's definitive pop music, it actually began in Paris, created by a group of Ivorian DJs at the Atlantis, an African nightclub in northeast Paris. These DJs, known as the 'Jet Set', became popular for their flamboyant style, often showing up at the club with large amounts of cash which they would hand out to audiences on the dance floor. Their aesthetic defined the early sounds of coupé décalé, apparent in the genre's name. In Nouchi (Ivorian slang), coupé means "to cheat" and décalé means to "run away", so coupé-décalé basically means to cheat somebody and run away. The 'somebody' cheated is generally interpreted to mean France or the West/Europe, finding parallels to the idea of "The Man" in American culture. Especially in the beginning, the songs often celebrated those who had used guile to 'make it' abroad. The word boucantier (English: "shoe-maker") was applied to performers with unusual style, as well as to their imitators.

The genre's first hit, "Sagacité" was pioneered by the late Stephane Doukouré a.k.a. Douk Saga, a member of the 'Jet Set', during the post-2002 militaro-political crisis in Côte d'Ivoire.  "[Coupé-décalé ] has become very popular at a time of conflict; in fact, the country, has been going through this protracted political and military crisis, with debilitating social and economic effects".

Although arising from this time of political turmoil, coupé-décalé lyrically addresses topics such as relationships, earning money and maintaining a good mood or 'bonne ambiance'. Much of its lyrics refer to specific dance moves, often referencing current events such as the avian flu dance or Guantanamo (with hand movements imitating hands raised in chains). These global themes could have helped to make coupé-décalé so deeply popular across a politically divided Côte d'Ivoire and spread its influence so far across Africa and the diaspora. there has been a growing interest in coupé décalé. In February 2009, Akwaaba Music released an Ivorian and Ghanaian compilation, one of the first legal worldwide releases of coupé décalé, highlighting some of the recent coupé décalé released in Côte d'Ivoire. The compilation features music by DJ Menza, DJ Bonano, DJ Mix 1er & Eloh DJ and Kedjevara.

Movements within coupé-décalé
In 2008, Georges Dyoula distinguished 3 waves in the development of coupé-décalé:

 1st wave, ~2002–2004: The appearance, success and domination of the JetSet, DJ Allan, DJ Arafat, DJ Jacob, DJ Serpent Noir, DJ Christy-B, DJ Arsenal, Don Mike le Guru, Bloco, Erickson le Zulu, DJ String, DJ Ressource, Shégal Mokonzi, Mama Ministre, Youlés Inter, DJ Jeff, Ayano.
 2nd wave, 2005–2006: This period is essentially led by «la danse de la Moto» and dances relating to football (Konami, Drogbacité, Kolocité). The appearance, success and domination of Boulevard DJ, DJ Bombastik, DJ Rodrigue, Shanaka Yakusa, Danny Blue DJ, DJ Gaoussou, Oxxy Norgy, Roland Le Binguiss, Douk Saga, Christina DJ, Le Molare, Solo Béton, Erickson le Zulu, DJ Zidane, Ligue DJ, DJ Disconty, Kilabongo, PS One DJ.
 3rd wave – 2006–2010: The 3rd wave includes the most new artists and new derivative styles of dance. This wave is also associated with a ‘Congolization’ of rhythms, lyrics and artists. The appearance, success and domination of DJ Lewis, DJ Bonano, DJ Roi Lion, Francky Dicaprio, Flamzy DJ, Joscar DJ, DJ Mix, Elloh DJ, DJ Phéno, Mustapha Al Kabila, Mareshal DJ, Harmony, Maty Dollar, Linda de Lindsay, Ronaldo R9, DJ TV3, Debordeaux DJ, Erickson le Zulu, Dollar-R, Miki Dollar, TPJ New Version, Jean-jacques Kouamé, Abou Nidal.

Socio-political interpretations

In 2005, Vladimir Cagnolari suggested that the music is a way Ivorians are coping with their unstable political situation.

"For a few hours, the rooms is transformed into an ephemeral temple of festival/party, using carefreeness and amusement to counter the socio-political problems of a country still waiting for peace. ... In a musical landscape dominated by patriotic and military music, coupé-décalé arrives like a breath of fresh air to forget the difficult context in which Ivorians are living."

In 2006, Dominik Kohlhagen wrote:
"Over the past three years, coupé-décalé has become one of the most thriving forms of popular music in francophone Africa. Produced by people who claim to have achieved "success" abroad, coupé-décalé represents "elsewhere" as a site from which one can achieve a certain status in consumer society so as to return home to be celebrated. This music expresses generationel transformations that affect lifestyles in Africa as well as ways of projecting oneself in the world."

Artists
The prominent artists of coupé-décalé are Douk-Saga (Doukouré) with its Jet Set, DJ Brico, DJ Arsenal, Papa Ministre with his famous tune "Coupé-Décalé Chinois", David Tayorault, Afrika Reprezenta, and many other talented Ivorian artists. DJ Lewis is a particularly notable singer, famous for his Grippe Aviaire Dance (en: avian flu dance).

In 2005, Jessy Matador decided to create his own group called La Sélésao composed of members Dr. Love, Linho and Benkoff. The same members also formed the first edition of the group Magic System. In late 2007, they signed with Oyas Records before signing with Wagram Records in spring 2008. They released their début single "Décalé Gwada" in June 2008, becoming one of the hits of that summer. On 24 November 2008, the group released the album Afrikan New Style, a musical hybrid of African and Caribbean influences with more urban sounds. The style includes influences of zouk, dancehall, reggae, hip hop, coupé-décalé, ndombolo and kuduro. In June 2013, an upbeat dance song was released on YouTube by Minjin titled "Coupé-Décalé". It featured Iyanya, a Nigerian artist famous for his hit single "Kukere".

See also
 Sub-Saharan African community of Paris

References

External links
 Video with Lino Versace – Member of the famous Jet Set Crew who are spearheading the coupé decalé scene.
 Trailer of documentary Coupe Decale (in French)

African electronic dance music
Ivorian styles of music
French styles of music
Pop music genres